Play in Group B of the 2006 FIFA World Cup began on 10 June and completed on 20 June 2006. England won the group, and advanced to the second round, along with Sweden. Paraguay and Trinidad and Tobago were eliminated.

Background
Group B was the second of eight groups to start play at the 2006 FIFA World Cup in Germany. The competition consisted of 32 competitors, split into eight groups of four teams. The sides would play each other on a round-robin basis with the top two teams in each group advancing to the round of 16.

Standings

England advanced to play Ecuador (runner-up of Group A) in the round of 16.
Sweden advanced to play Germany (winner of Group A) in the round of 16.

Matches
All times local (CEST/UTC+2)

England vs Paraguay

Trinidad and Tobago vs Sweden

England vs Trinidad and Tobago

Sweden vs Paraguay

Sweden vs England

Paraguay vs Trinidad and Tobago

References

Bibliography
 

B group
Group
Group
Group
Group